Five ships of the Royal Navy have been named HMS Minstrel after the medieval European entertainer Minstrel:
 launched in 1807 and sold in 1817
 a  launched in 1865
 an  launched in 1911
 an  launched in 1944, she was sold to Thailand in 1947 and renamed Phosampton. Preserved as a museum ship
 a  launched as M.I in 1939, renamed Miner I in 1942 and Minstrel in 1962. She was sold in 1967

References

Royal Navy ship names